Northern Sierra Miwok is a Miwok language spoken in California, in the upper Mokelumne and Calaveras valleys.

Phonology

References 

 Callaghan, Catherine A. 1987. Northern Sierra Miwok dictionary. Berkeley: University of California Press.
 Freeland, L. S. 1951. Language of the Sierra Miwok. (Publications in Anthropology and Linguistics, Memoir 6.) Bloomington, IN: Indiana University Press.
 Golla, Victor. 2011. California Indian languages. Berkeley: University of California Press.
 Northern Miwok Indians. "Rodriguez-Nieto Guide" Sound Recordings (California Indian Library Collections), LA007, LA140. Berkeley: California Indian Library Collections, 1993. "Sound recordings reproduced from the Language Archive sound recordings at the Language Laboratory, University of California, Berkeley".

External links 
Northern Sierra Miwok at the Survey of California and Other Indian Languages
Plains Miwok, California Language Archive
OLAC resources in and about the Northern Sierra Miwok language
Northern Sierra Miwok, World Atlas of Language Structures Online
Northern Sierra Miwok Dictionary, Volumes 109-110

Utian languages
Miwok
Endangered indigenous languages of the Americas